Pacific World (previously Sun Princess) is a  built in 1995 and operated by Peace Boat. At the time of her construction, she was one of the largest cruise ships in the world.

Sun Princess was the ship on which the 1998–99 (1977-86 previously known as The Love Boat in its earlier seasons in its original run on TV) television show The Love Boat'''s short-lived revival run as Love Boat: The Next Wave starring Robert Urich was filmed.

In July 2018, Sun Princess underwent a two-week dry dock. She received new livery design, new stateroom category, shops, and other onboard amenities.

In September 2020, Sun Princess was sold to Peace Boat. The Sun Princess was renamed Pacific World.<ref>{{cite web|url=https://www.lr.org/en/lrofships/|title=LR Ships in class: Pacific World|access-date=2020-11-18}}</ref>

Ports of call

From its debut in 1995 until 2007, Sun Princess primarily served Caribbean and Alaskan cruise routes.

Since November 2007, Sun Princess has been seasonally based at Sydney, Australia. Cruises offered from that time circumnavigations Australia, circumnavigations New Zealand, and visits to New Caledonia and Vanuatu. In 2012, she offered her first world cruise.

In April 2008, Sun Princess was based in Australia, operating out of Sydney during the winter months, and from Melbourne during the summer months. For the 2008/2009 season the cruise program included Australian circumnavigations, Fremantle - Malacca Straits return, Melbourne -  New Zealand / South Pacific. Sun Princess also sailed from Sydney for Melbourne plus Whitsundays return, a Japan return itinerary, and a 75 night Grand Pacific trip.

During summer 2008/2009 whilst Sun Princess was operating out of Melbourne, she was joined by Dawn Princess operating out of Sydney. Dawn Princess was also permanently based in Australia from that time which was a change from Princess Cruises' original plans.

Demand for Sun Princess cruises between Sydney and Fremantle and beyond from April to June 2008 was so strong that Princess Cruises scheduled additional sailings for 2009.  The company also decided to base the vessel in Fremantle from April to August that year. Despite the availability of cheap domestic air connections, many customers booking Sun Princess voyages between Sydney and Fremantle in 2009 opted instead to extend their trips by traveling across Australia on a connecting Indian Pacific rail service.

Cruises on Sun Princess from Fremantle in 2009 included the first Indian Ocean voyage of its kind from Australia. A 46-night sailing from Fremantle visited Singapore, Malaysia, Thailand, India, the Maldives, the Seychelles, South Africa, Madagascar, Mauritius and Réunion.

In 2013, Sun Princess sailed round-trip cruises from Tokyo, Japan marking the first of Princess Cruises deployments from there. In 2014, she sailed an extended Japan cruise program, sailing from Otaru, Hokkaido and Kobe.

In 2019-2020 cruise season, Sun Princess sailed an extended Western Australia program. The ship homeported in Fremantle, Australia for 141 days.

It was announced in June 2018 that Sun Princess would be used as a floating hotel for the 2020 Tokyo Olympics. The ship was to be docked at Tokyo's Yokohama Port between 23 July and 9 August 2020, specifically to provide more hotel room space for Olympic guests. It was estimated that the ship would receive 36,000 overnight stays during the Tokyo Olympics.

Accidents and incidents
In October 2013, a 73-year-old man "disappeared". The ship was on a 16-day cruise from Fremantle to Sydney. The wife of the man reported him missing. The search included: three aircraft and the Royal Australian Navy ship  in an area just north of Cape Londonderry. As of 8 October 2013 the missing passenger had not been found.

In November 2014, an 84-year-old elderly man fell overboard off the coast of Sydney. The ship was returning to White Bay in Sydney after a 13-day New Zealand cruise.

On 6 September 2017, a pipe burst onboard Sun Princess causing flooding to the lower decks affecting passengers in their cabins.

Outbreaks of gastroenteritis occurred repeatedly on cruises in 2016 and 2017.

COVID-19 pandemic

Princess Cruises ship was not allowed to dock at a port in Madagascar on 13 February 2020 as it had visited Thailand, where there were cases of SARS-CoV-2, less than 14 days before. The ship docked at Réunion on 1 March, but passengers were met by a crowd of about 30 people who insisted that the passengers must be inspected for SARS-CoV-2, and tried to prevent them from leaving the port area. Objects were thrown at passengers, and the police deployed tear gas. Princess Cruises said that there were no concerns of SARS-CoV-2 on the ship.

On 26 March 2020, the Department of Health of Western Australia announced that a passenger from Sun Princess had tested positive for the virus.

Notes

References

Notes

Bibliography

External links 

 Princess Cruises website

1995 ships
Ships built in Monfalcone
Ships built by Fincantieri
Ships of Princess Cruises
Cruise ships involved in the COVID-19 pandemic